Paul Douma (born November 21, 1962) is a Canadian rower. He won a gold medal at the 1985 World Rowing Championships in Hazewinkel with the men's quadruple sculls.

References

1962 births
Living people
Canadian male rowers
Olympic rowers of Canada
Rowers at the 1988 Summer Olympics
Rowers from St. Catharines
World Rowing Championships medalists for Canada
20th-century Canadian people